Haji Muhammad Sidik Airport  is an airport located at Trinsing, South Teweh, North Barito Regency, Central Kalimantan, Indonesia. The airport was inaugurated by Vice President Ma'ruf Amin and Minister of Transportation Budi Karya Sumadi on 30 March 2021.

Airlines and destinations

Passenger

References

Airports in Central Kalimantan